The El Tovar Stables  at the south rim of the Grand Canyon were built about 1904, at the same time the nearby El Tovar Hotel was built, to house the animals used in general transportation around the park.  Collectively called the "transportation department" in the early 20th century, the three structures comprised a horse barn or stable, a mule barn and a blacksmith shop.

The horse barn is the largest of the structures. The wood-frame structure is sheathed on the lower half with board-and-batten siding, with wood shingles on the upper half. The roof is covered in green asphalt shingles. The interior contains two main spaces, with an open room in the east that was probably used for wagons. The west side has two floors. The upper level was used for storage, and contains three rooms formerly used as storerooms. Downstairs are open stalls on one side and closed stalls on the other side. The building is topped by a large cupola.

The interior has an upper and lower level, disposed similarly to the horse barn, except the stalls are enclosed with open ends. The mule barn has a somewhat smaller cupola than the horse barn. The exterior appearance matches the other two buildings. The interior is divided into three rooms, one of which contains two blacksmith's forges.

The structures continue to be used to house and support the mule trains that take visitors and supplies to the Phantom Ranch at the bottom of the Grand Canyon. The barns and shop were listed on the National Register of Historic Places on September 6, 1974.  They are also contributing components to the Grand Canyon Village Historic District, a National Historic Landmark District.

References

Buildings and structures in Grand Canyon National Park
Rustic architecture in Arizona
Stables in the United States
National Register of Historic Places in Coconino County, Arizona
Park buildings and structures on the National Register of Historic Places in Arizona
Transport infrastructure completed in 1904
1904 establishments in Arizona Territory
Buildings and structures in Coconino County, Arizona
Historic districts on the National Register of Historic Places in Arizona
Agricultural buildings and structures on the National Register of Historic Places in Arizona
Agricultural buildings and structures on the National Register of Historic Places
National Register of Historic Places in Grand Canyon National Park
Individually listed contributing properties to historic districts on the National Register in Arizona